See Thru Broadcasting is a record label that was the brainchild of record producer D. Sardy. For two years, new bands were jettisoned onto the college music charts and into Mom and Pop record stores. The web site was central to See Thru's identity, which Zurkow art directed. All album art and ancillary packaging was designed by Nancy Nowacek and Zurkow.

Bands
Enon
Gwen Mars
Mike G
Starlight Mints

See also
 List of record labels

External links
See Thru Broadcasting

American record labels
Alternative rock record labels